Zhenya is a given name, and a nickname for multiple Slavic names.

Notable holders include:

Zhenya Belousov
Zhenya Gay
Zhenya Gershman
Zhenya Medvedeva
Zhenya Plushenko

See also
Nickname of the Sopkarga mammoth
Zhenya-class minesweeper, a class of Soviet warship

Slavic given names
Nicknames